This is a list of Ithaca College people.

Ithacans are persons affiliated with Ithaca College, especially alumni.  The following is a list of such notable Ithacans.

Government
Christopher Bateman, member of the New Jersey General Assembly
Michael A. Battle, former Director of the Executive Office for United States Attorneys, United States Department of Justice
Ed Diana, county executive of Orange County, New York
Richard K. Eaton, Senior Judge on the United States Court of International Trade
Eileen Filler-Corn, Speaker of the of Virginia House of Delegates
Emily Gallagher, member of the New York State Assembly
Loni Hancock, member of the California State Senate

Business

Executives
Chris Burch (B.S. 1976), founder and CEO of Burch Creative Capital; co-founder of Tory Burch LLC
Robert Iger (B.S. 1973), president and CEO, The Walt Disney Company
Stew Leonard, Jr. (B.S. 1977), president and CEO, Stew Leonard's
Scott Griesemer (B.S. 1995) Chief Operating Officer,HealthSun Health Plans, Chairman of the Board, Naranja Grande

Media and entertainment

Directors and producers
Matthew Bennett (TV producer) (1986), scripted and non-scripted director and producer. Created modern Aftershow format with After the Catch.
Bill D'Elia, writer, director and executive producer of How to Get Away with Murder, Chicago Hope, Boston Legal, Ally McBeal and others; co-creator of Judging Amy
Peter Dougherty (1977), creator of Yo! MTV Raps
Barbara Gaines (B.A. 1979), Emmy Award-winning executive producer, Late Show with David Letterman
Brian Herzlinger (1997), director, special correspondent on The Tonight Show
David Guy Levy, film producer, August and Terri
Mark Romanek, filmmaker (One Hour Photo, Never Let Me Go) and Grammy Award-winning music video director
Mike Royce, executive producer and writer, Everybody Loves Raymond and One Day at a Time
Deborah Snyder, film producer, DC Extended Universe
Larry Teng, television director and producer
Liz Tigelaar, television writer and executive producer, Life Unexpected and Casual
Michael Miceli (B.S., 1999), director, "That Was New York" and "The Candy Store"

Actors and Designers
Kathryn Allison, 2014 winner of the NYMF Next Big Broadway Sensation competition
Erinn Bartlett, actress
David Boreanaz (B.S. 1991), actor, Buffy the Vampire Slayer, Angel, Bones
Paul Gallo (B.F.A. 1974), Tony Award-nominated Broadway lighting designer;
The Birthday Boys, actors, The Birthday Boys
John Ross Bowie, actor, The Big Bang Theory
Kerry Butler (B.F.A. 1992), Tony Award-nominated Broadway actress, Xanadu, Catch Me If You Can and Little Shop of Horrors
Matt Cavenaugh (B.F.A. 2001), Broadway actor, West Side Story
Andrew Daly, actor, Eastbound and Down, MADtv and Semi-Pro
Michelle Federer (B.F.A. 1995), theater and film actress; originated the character "Nessarose" in Broadway's Wicked
Ben Feldman, Emmy Award-nominated actor, Mad Men and Superstore
Ilene Graff, actress and singer
Sean Grandillo, actor, Spring Awakening, The Real O'Neals
Jennifer Hall, actress
Jeremy Jordan, Tony Award-nominated and Grammy Award-nominated star of Supergirl, Newsies and Finding Neverland; also starred on Smash and in The Last 5 Years
Ricki Lake, Emmy Award-winning actress, Serial Mom, Hairspray; television host
Gavin MacLeod, Golden Globe Award-nominated actor, The Love Boat, The Mary Tyler Moore Show
Daniel McDonald, Tony Award-nominated actor
Mark Moses, actor, Desperate Housewives, Mad Men
David Newsom, actor and producer
C. C. H. Pounder, Emmy Award-nominated actress, Bagdad Café, The Shield, Avatar and NCIS New Orleans
Brian Sack, humorist, author and contributor on Fox News Channel's Glenn Beck program
Charlie Schlatter, actor, Diagnosis: Murder
Amanda Setton (B.A. 2007), film and TV actress, Gossip Girl, The Mindy Project, The Crazy Ones
Aaron Tveit, Broadway lead actor of Catch Me If You Can and Next to Normal, starred in USA Network's Graceland and Fox's Grease: Live
Jeff Winkless, voice-over actor

Hosts
Alan Colmes (attended), host of Hannity & Colmes and The Alan Colmes Show
Chip Hines (B.A. 1990), host of Spotlight on CatholicTV
Chris Kellogg, morning radio host for WMAS-FM and The Kellogg Krew
Ricki Lake (attended), Emmy Award-winning actress and television personality, The Ricki Lake Show
Todd Schnitt, conservative radio personality and host of The Schnitt Show
Robin Young, host of National Public Radio's Here and Now
Kyle Clark, host of 9 News Denver’s Next With Kyle Clark

Comedians
Joe Pera (2010), stand-up comedian, star/creator of Adult Swim's Joe Pera Talks with You

Musicians

Kate Aldrich (B.M. 1996), internationally renowned mezzo-soprano
Rick Beato (B.M. 1980), YouTube personality, multi-instrumentalist, and music producer and educator.
Cindy Bradley (B.F.A. Jazz Studies 1998), jazz trumpet player and composer
Nick Brignola, jazz baritone saxophonist
Suzan Brittan, dance vocalist
Robert E. Brown, lead ethnomusicologist and musician
Patricia Craig, renowned operatic soprano
Margaret Daum, opera singer
Richard De Benedictis (B.A. 1958), Broadway and television composer
Henrique de Curitiba, composer
Gavin DeGraw (did not graduate), Grammy Award-nominated and platinum-selling musician best known for Billboard Hot 100 hits "I Don't Want to Be" and "Not Over You"
Tony DeSare (1997), jazz musician
Matthew Hoch, singer; leading music scholar and teacher
Scott LaFaro, influential jazz bassist with the Bill Evans Trio
New York Voices, Grammy Award-winning vocal music group of Ithaca alumni
Maureen Tucker, drummer for The Velvet Underground
Ruth Underwood, xylophonist for Frank Zappa and the Mothers of Invention
Rick Beato, music producer, YouTube personality

Editors and publishers
Robert Bluey, editor of the daily online edition of Human Events
David A. Weiner, executive editor of Famous Monsters of Filmland and writer/director of In Search of Darkness

Journalists
Luke Broadwater, Pulitzer Prize and George Polk Award winner, Congressional Correspondent for The New York Times
David Brody, journalist and White House Correspondent for the Christian Broadcasting Network
Thomas Donnelly,  author of AEI's National Security Outlook
Bob Kur, former national NBC reporter, now with Washington Post Radio
David Muir (B.S. 1995), ABC news anchor for ABC World News Tonight with David Muir
Jessica Savitch (B.S. 1968), first female network anchor
Andrew Marchand, sports media reporter for the New York Post. Baseball writer for 11 years at ESPN.

Photographers

Nydia Blas, visual artist whose works explore the identities of young black women

New media
Alex Westerman, Webby Award-winning creative director

Writers
Max Brallier, children's book author, Emmy Award-winning writer, and screenwriter. Author of The Last Kids on Earth and Eerie Elementary
Kristen Britain, author of Green Rider and First Rider's Call
Jason Colavito, author
Michael Levin (2011), television writer, co-host of the Rights to Ricky Sanchez podcast
Allan Loeb, film screenwriter, Things We Lost in the Fire, Wall Street: Money Never Sleeps, The Dilemma
Mark Mahoney (B.S. 1985), Pulitzer Prize for Editorial Writing, The Post-Star
Sandra McDonald, author of The Outback Stars and The Stars Down Under
Tish Rabe (1973), children's book author and writer of over 40 Dr. Seuss books
Chris Regan (1989), Emmy Award-winning writer for The Daily Show
Bill Roorbach, novelist, short story writer and memoirist
Rod Serling, former faculty, taught at Ithaca College Communications School 1967-1975; Emmy Award-winning screenwriter; creator of The Twilight Zone 
K. M. Soehnlein, novelist and essayist
Julia Spencer-Fleming, author of the Clare Fergusson/Russ Van Alstyne mystery series
Julie Spira, author of The Perils of Cyber-Dating
Liz Tigelaar, author, television writer and producer, Life Unexpected
Michael Miceli (B.S. 1999), screenwriter, feature films "Due Season" and "Fallout"

Sportscasters
Bruce Beck (B.S. 1978), weekend sports anchor for WNBC, NY
Brendan Burke (B.S. 2006) sportscaster for Fox Sports and television announcer for New York Islanders on MSG Network
Mike Catalana (B.S. 1985), sports director WHAM-TV Rochester, New York
Ed Cohen (B.S 2005), WEPN-FM Radio voice of the New York Knicks.
Kevin Connors (B.S. 1997), ESPN sportscaster
Lanny Frattare (B.S. 1970), play-by-play announcer for MLB's Pittsburgh Pirates
Eric Frede (B.S. 1988), Boston Bruins studio host, NESN
Drew Goodman (B.S. 1985) Television Announcer Colorado Rockies 2002–present, Denver Nuggets 1994-2004
Neil Hartman (B.S. 1982), sports anchor, Comcast SportsNet Philadelphia
Jack Michaels (B.S. 1995), announcer for the Edmonton Oilers on Sportsnet
Nick Nickson, announcer for Los Angeles Kings
Sal Paolantonio, ESPN sportscaster; member of the college's Philadelphia Executive Committee
Eric Reid, TV announcer for Miami Heat
Karl Ravech (B.S. 1987), ESPN sportscaster

Sport

Management
Les Otten (B.S. 1971), vice chairman and partner, Boston Red Sox Organization
Eddie Sawyer, professional baseball manager for the Philadelphia Phillies

Coaches
Jerry Welsh, head coach college basketball Potsdam State University, head coach college basketball Iona College
Henny Hiemenz, head college football coach, Carroll University
George Kissell, coach for St. Louis Cardinals
Tom Nugent, college football head coach and sportscaster; College Football Hall of Famer; developer of the I Formation
Eddie Sawyer, former Philadelphia Phillies manager and MLB scout
Barry Smith, former NHL associate coach

Athletes
Glen Cook, professional baseball player for the Texas Rangers
Conor Heun, mixed martial artist
Tommy Hicks, former light heavyweight boxer
Robert Marella, former professional wrestler (known as Gorilla Monsoon); ringside commentator for the World Wrestling Federation
Emily Morley, first Bahamian rower to qualify for the Olympic Games
Meghan Musnicki, rower and member of the gold medal-winning women's 8+ for the United States at the 2012 London Olympics
Tim Locastro, professional baseball player for the New York Yankees
 Travis Warech (born 1991), American-German-Israeli basketball player for Israeli team  Hapoel Be'er Sheva

Scientists and engineers
Steven Van Slyke (B.S. 1978), chemist,  inventor with over 20 patents in OLED materials and device architecture

Other
Richard Jadick (B.S. 1987), combat surgeon who was awarded the Bronze Star for service in Iraq
Giorgio A. Tsoukalos (1998), television presenter specializing in the ancient astronaut hypothesis

References

External links
 Official alumni website

 
Ithaca College